The Château de Romécourt is located in Azoudange in Moselle, and in the Lorraine Regional Natural Park in the middle of the forest and the lakes of Sarrebourg. The castle has been registered in the French list of historical monuments since December 28, 1976.

Construction 
The castle was built by Michel l’Enfant in 1564. It was then completed in the 17th and 19th centuries by the addition of stables and chapel.

Architecture 
The façades, the well and roofs of the château are registered in the French list of historical monuments.

The buildings are made of bricks. Inspired by the Renaissance, the façade displays diamond shapes. The access is guarded by two doors "French" and "German" built in stone.

Park and forests 
The lands of Romécourt include  of forests, fields and nature.

See also 
 List of châteaux in Lorraine

References

Châteaux in Moselle (department)